Gdańsk Południowy is a former railway station in Gdańsk, Poland.
It was the first station in Gdańsk, built outside the city walls, as the municipal government refused to agree on removing fortifications in order to lead rails inside.
After the inauguration of the Gdańsk Główny station, this station became a freight-only one; the station building is no longer used.

Lines crossing the station

References 
Gdańsk Południowy at Polish stations database , URL accessed on 24 January 2006

External links
www.gdansk.pl (Gdańsk official website)
trojmiasto.pl (Tricity website)

Poludniowy
Disused railway stations in Pomeranian Voivodeship